Irma Helena Karvikko (29 September 1909, in Turku – 16 September 1994; surname until 1933 Blomqvist) was a Finnish journalist and politician. She was Deputy Minister for Social Affairs from 17 November 1953 to 4 May 1954 and Minister for Social Affairs from 27 May to 1 September 1957. She was a member of the Parliament of Finland, representing the National Progressive Party from 1948 to 1951, the People's Party of Finland from 1951 to 1958 and from 1962 to 1965 and the Liberal People's Party from 1965 to 1970.

References

1909 births
1994 deaths
People from Turku
People from Turku and Pori Province (Grand Duchy of Finland)
National Progressive Party (Finland) politicians
People's Party of Finland (1951) politicians
Liberals (Finland) politicians
Ministers of Social Affairs of Finland
Members of the Parliament of Finland (1948–51)
Members of the Parliament of Finland (1951–54)
Members of the Parliament of Finland (1954–58)
Members of the Parliament of Finland (1962–66)
Members of the Parliament of Finland (1966–70)
Women government ministers of Finland
20th-century Finnish women writers
20th-century Finnish writers
20th-century Finnish women politicians
Women members of the Parliament of Finland
Finnish women journalists
20th-century Finnish journalists